The Apple Bowl is a multi-purpose stadium located at the Parkinson Recreation Area in Kelowna, British Columbia. It is the home of the Okanagan Sun of the Canadian Junior Football League and the Okanagan FC of the Pacific Coast Soccer League. It is formally the home of the Okanagan Challenge of the same league. Besides hosting field events, it has a rubberized 400m running track and facilities for other track and field events. The stadium seats 1,054 in the grandstand, and an additional 1,200 on aluminum bleachers. and had new molded seating installed in the main grandstand in 2006. The Apple Bowl also has a mini-track, and sand pit for long jump as well as an area for Shot Put events. It is commonly used for Track and Field events. It has hosted the Canadian Bowl twice, in 1997 and 2000, with the latter game drawing a crowd of  6,200 spectators.

In 2005, the stadium hosted international age group soccer matches at Under 15 and Under 19 level between Canada and New Zealand.

References

Canadian football venues in British Columbia
Soccer venues in British Columbia
Sports venues in Kelowna
Athletics (track and field) venues in Canada
Multi-purpose stadiums in British Columbia